The Three Daughters of King O'Hara is an Irish fairy tale collected by Jeremiah Curtin in Myths and Folk-lore of Ireland. Reidar Th. Christiansen identified its origin as Co. Kerry.

The tale is related to the international cycle of the Animal as Bridegroom or The Search of the Lost Husband.

Synopsis

A king had three daughters.  One day, when he was away, his oldest daughter wished to marry.  She got his cloak of darkness, and wished for the handsomest man in the world.  He arrived in a golden coach with four horses to take her away.  Her second sister wished for the next best man, and he arrived in a golden coach with four horses to take her away.  Then the youngest wished for the best white dog, and it arrived in a golden coach with four horses to take her away.  The king returned and was enraged when his servants told him of the dog.

The oldest two were asked by their husbands how they wanted them during the day:  as they are during the day, or as they are at night.  Both want them as they are during the day.  Their husbands both are men during the day but seals at night.  The youngest was also asked and answered the same, so her husband was a dog by day and a handsome man by night.

She gave birth to a son.  Her husband went hunting and warned her not to weep if anything happened to the child.  A gray crow took the baby when he was a week old, and she did not weep.  It happened again, with a second son, but with their third child, a daughter, she dropped one tear, which she caught in a handkerchief.  Her husband was very angry.

Soon after, the king invited his three daughters and their husbands to his home.  Late at night, the queen went to look in their bedrooms, and saw that her two oldest had seals in their beds, but her youngest had a man.  She found and burned the dog's skin.  The husband jumped up, angry, and said that if he had been able to stay three nights under her father's roof he could have been a man both day and night, but now he had to leave her.

He set out, but she chased after him, never letting him out of sight.  They came to a house, and he sent her to spend the night inside.  A little boy there called her mother, and a woman there gave her scissors that would turn rags into cloth of gold.  The next day, she chased after her husband again, and they came to another house, where another little boy called her mother, and a woman gave her a comb that would turn a diseased head healthy, and give it gold hair.  The third day, she still chased after her husband, and the third house held a one-eyed little girl.  The woman realized what weeping had done.  She took her handkerchief where she had caught her tear, and put the eye back.  The woman gave her a whistle that would summon all the birds of the world.

They went on, but he explained that the Queen of Tír na nÓg had cursed him, and now he must go and marry her.  She followed him into the lower kingdom and stayed with a washerwoman, helping her.  She saw a henwife's daughter, all in rags, and snipped her rags with the scissors, so she wore cloth of gold.  Her mother told the queen, who demanded them.  The princess asked for a night with her husband in return, and the queen agreed but drugged her husband.  The next day, the princess cured another daughter of the henwife with the comb, and the same exchange was made for it.

The princess blew the whistle and consulted the birds.  They told her that only her husband could kill the queen, because a holly-tree, before the castle, held a wether, the wether held a duck, the duck held an egg, and the egg held her heart and life, and only her husband could cut the holly tree.  Then she blew the whistle again, attracting a hawk and a fox and caught them.  She traded the whistle for a third night, but left a letter with his servants, telling him all.

Her husband read the letter and met her by the tree.  He cut it down.  The wether escaped, but the fox caught it; the duck escaped, but the falcon caught it, and the egg was crushed, killing the queen.

The princess and her husband live happily in Tír na nÓg.

Analysis

Tale type
Norwegian folklorist Reidar Thoralf Christiansen classified the tale as belonging to type 425, "The Search for the Lost Husband", of the international Aarne-Thompson-Uther Index. These tales mostly refer to a human maiden being betrothed to an animal bridegroom, who is actually a prince cursed into a non-human form. For example, the hero of the tale was said to be transformed into a white dog by the druidecht of the Queen of Tir-na-Nog.

Alfred Nutt described the story as a "Beauty and the Beast tale", another type of the ATU index related to the animal bridegroom tales.

The tale also contains type ATU 302, "The Ogre's (Devil's) Heart in the Egg", a set of stories where the villain hides its heart or soul in an external place and can only be defeated if the heroes destroy its external location.

Motifs
According to 's study on some 1,100 variants of Cupid and Psyche and related types, the motif of the "wishing chair" appears in Celtic, Irish and British variants. In the same study, he concluded that the dog as the animal husband appears "confined to the Germanic and Celtic areas".

The motif of the separation of the heroine from her children is located by scholarship across Celtic and Germanic speaking areas.

Variants

Europe

Ireland
An Irish language variant titled Cú Bán an t-Sléibhe ("The White Hound of the Mountain"; IPA:[kuːbˠaːnˠənˠˈtʲlʲeːvʲə]) was published in the academic journal Zeitschrift für celtische Philologie. In this tale, the king's three daughters open a door to a room their father forbid them to enter, and sit on a chair. All three express their wishes for a husband, and the youngest says she will marry "The White Hound of the Mountain", without knowing if he exists or not. They marry and she gives birth to three children of wondrous aspect, who are taken from her by unknown forces. At the end of the tale, the heroine uses golden items she was given on her way to her husband's location to bribe the witch (named Cúl-Carrach) and her daughter (named Maol-Charrach) for three nights with him. The witch who cursed him can only be defeated by breaking the egg with her life in it. Reidar Christiansen identified this variant as hailing from Galway, and also classified the tale as types 425 and 302.

In a variant from County Mayo, collected from a sixty-year-old woman named Una Canavan with the title The Hill of Needles, a widowed nobleman has three daughters. One day, he forgets to lock up a certain door of his house, and his eldest daughter enters it. She talks to the chair that she wants to marry an officer. She tells her middle sister, who wishes to the chair for a husband. The third also wishes to the chair, which says a white fawn shall marry her. The promised husbands appear to the ladies, including the white fawn. The lady learns the fawn is a man, who asks her which form she prefers; she answers that he should be a man at night and a fawn by day. She wants to visit her family, but her husband warns her that if she sheds a tear, a coach will not return for her to bring her home to the fawn husband. She goes to her father's house and gives birth to a son, who is taken from her. The next year, she gives birth to a daughter, who is also taken from her. She sheds a tear and the coach does not come. The lady returns to the husband's home on foot and finds only a field of nettles. She sees another coach with her husband inside and follows it; along the road, three houses that she visits, each housing one of her husband's sisters and one of her children. Her sisters-in-law give her scissors, a tablecloth and a comb. Her husband bids her goodbye, since his coach will traverse the Hill of Big Needles and the Hill of Little Needles, reachable only by iron shoes. She throws some blood on her husband's shirt as he departs, and looks for a blacksmith to create on the iron shoes. She reaches the other side, finds a woman crying about the man's shirt with blood and washes it. The lady buys three nights with her husband from the new wife and learns from him that his new wife can inly be killed by finding an egg inside a duck, inside a ram, inside a well, and throw it at her mole.

In another tale from Belmullet, County Mayo, collected in 1903 from informant Antoine Sirin (Searns) with the title Cú Bán an tSléiḃe ("The White Hound of the Mountain"), a king has a magical wishing chair. His three daughters, the princesses, wish to see it for themselves its mystical powers. Each girl sits on the chair and wishes for a husband: the first for the king of the Eastern World, the second for the King of the Western World and the youngest for the titular "White Hound of the Mountain". As they predicted, each of their husbands appear to claim them. The third suitor, however, is not met with the same reception as the others. After three attempts, the White Hound takes the third princess as his intended and goes with her to their new home. The White Hound reveals himself to be a man by night and a hound by day. They live together and she bears him three children. After each birth, the children are taken from them by a mysterious lady. The third princess visits her family and, hounded by her relatives, tells everything about her marries life. The White Hound becomes a crow and disappears, and his wife goes after him. The princess visits three houses and obtains a pair of scissors, a comb and a reel for winding yarn. At last she reaches the castle of the Queen of the Black Cloak, the witch who enchanted her husband, and bribes her with the golden objects she received.

In another homonymous variant titled Cú Bán a' tSléiḃe ("The White Hound of the Mountain"), a king has a magical wishing chair (cathaoir a' tsóláis). Each of his three daughters wish for a husband: the elder for a husband more beautiful than the sun, the middle one for one more beautiful than the moon, and the third for the White Hound. In time, all three bridegrooms arrive to get their respective brides, the White Hound taking his through a secret forest path. In their castle, the White Hound  asks his wife which form she prefers him to be, and she anwwrs that as a man by night. Some time later, the princess is pregnant with their first child (a son, White Hound prophecies), and is taken to her family's castle to give birth, but with instructions to leave the child outside the gate for the White Hound to take him. The same happens to their second child, but, with the third pregnancy, the White Hound alerts his wife not to return home, since her new step-mother will force her to disclose the princess's married life. Despite the warnings, the princess goes to her father's castle and leaves her third son outside. Inside, the princess's stepmother tortures her with an iron poker, and, to avoid further harm to herself, the princess gives in and tells everything to her perfidious step-mother. The princess awaits for her husband to come, but he does not, so she walks by herself to the White Hound's castle, finding nothing but ruins. She notices three sods and picks them up. When she tosses one, her husband appears with their sons, and flees soon after. The princess runs after him, until she stops to rest by an old woman's hut. Before the princss leaves, the old woman tells her hier family stopped there - her proof a half-bitten sandwich -, and gives her a mgic scissors. Her pursuit continues with two next stops, where she gets a comb and a box, until she reaches her father-in-law's castle. For a year and a day, the White Hound (back to human form), lives with his father, and announces he shall marry one that can wash his bloodied shirt. The princess washes it, but the hen-wife's daughter takes the credit for it, and is set to marry the human White Hound. The princess uses the old women's gifts (a scissors that turn cloth to silk, a comb that turns hair golden and the box that sping yarn) to bribe the false bride for three nights with the White Hound. For the first two nights, she cannot wake him up, due to him drinking a sleeping potion, until the third day, where he wakes up and recognizes her.

Wales
Scottish folklorist John Francis Campbell claimed that an oral version told in 1812 to a man named John Dewar by a servant woman, was a version of a "popular tale" written in Wales "about 400 years ago". In this tale, titled an t urisgeal aig na righre Righ na thuirabhinn agus righ nan Ailp, the King of Ailp and his kingdom were killed by the druids, leaving only a son and a daughter. His daughter was trained by the druids and gained skin green as moss. The son climbs a mountain name Bean ghloine with his father's sword and scepter. Another druid curses him into animal form (a greyhound). He abandons the items on the mountain and flees to his sister. The prince, then, must remain as a greyhound until a maiden agrees to marry him, and his sister nurses three children and receives a kiss from a king's son. Some time later, the King of the Urbhin, while at war with another king, loses his way into a thick mist and ends up at the greyhound's castle. He kicks up the former king's bones and the greyhound, for this affront, demands the king of Urbhin surrenders one of his daughters as ransom. The king surrenders his daughter and she marries the greyhound. The princess lives with the greyhound and discovers he is a human prince. They marry, and her sisters become jealous. The princess's brother also falls in love with the greyhound's sister, the green girl, after drinking a potion of "mheadair Bhuidh" (yellow mead) from her hand. The princess's sisters conspire with a druid to dethrone her sister and become the greyhound's queen: when the time comes to give birth, for three times the princess's child is taken from her by a green hand in a window, but each child cries and the mother takes the teardrops. The greyhound, now a human prince, announces he will marry the one who can retrieve his father's sword and scepter from the glass mountain. The princess accomplishes it, but her sisters take the credit. Next, they must wash the bloodstained shirts that belonged to those slain by the druids. The princess also washes all but one, and stays three nights on the (now human) greyhound's bed. On the first two nights, he is asleep, but acknowledges his wife on the third night, and they return to the former kingdom of Ailp with the green girl (his sister). The tale continues as the "wicked druid" Dubhmalurraidh changes one of the princess's sisters into her shape, to cast the king into confusion. However, the green sister produces her father's sword and scepter (retrieved by her sister-in-law) and her three nephews.

Iceland
Adeline Ritterhaus summarized another Icelandic variant she named Der zum Riesen verzauberte Königssohn ("The King's Son changed into a Giant"). In this tale, a royal couple has three daughters. One day, the king gets lost in a thick mist, until a giant appears with a proposition: he will save the king's life, in exchange for the king's third daughter. After three times, the king concedes and agrees. He returns home and explains the story to his daughters. The youngest daughter marries the giant. The princess gives birth to three children, two boys and a girl, which are taken from her by a giantess and a red-brown she-dog. At the end of the tale, the giant is disenchanted into his true form, Prince Sigurdur, who reveals that the giantess was his mother and the she-dog his sister, now both restored to their original forms.

Americas

United States
In a variant from Letcher County, Kentucky collected by Marie Campbell with the title The Girl That Married a Flop-Eared Hound, a widowed king walks in the wood and sees a "fine hound-dog with long flop-ears". He asks the dog what it is doing there and the dog, to the king's surprise, answers that it wants to marry one of the king's daughters. Only the youngest daughter accepts the proposal, with the condition that she can visit her famlily whenever she wants. On their wedding day, the sisters use blindfolds to bear the humiliation of having a dog as brother-in-law, but instead a fine young man appears to marry their sister. One day, the princess is pregnant and wishes to give birth under her father's roof. The dog husband agrees, as long as she never reveals her husband's name. On two occasions, she gives birth to her child (the first a boy, the second a girl), who disappears two days after their birth when "fairy music" plays, leaving only wine and cookies on the cradle. The princess's sisters accuse the dog husband, and insist she reveals his name, but she remains steadfast. On the third visit, however, the princess gives birth to her third child and reveals her husband's name, "Sunshine on the Dew". This time, the child disappears, and so does her husband. She then goes on a quest for him, meeting three old women on the journey who give her a pair of scissors, a thimble and a needle. The princess uses the magical objects as bargaining chips to be able to spend a night with her husband, who is to be married to another woman. The tale was also classified as ATU 425A, "The Animal as Bridegroom".

See also
East of the Sun and West of the Moon
Prince Wolf
The Brown Bear of Norway
The Daughter of the Skies
The Dragon and the Prince
The Enchanted Pig
The Giant Who Had No Heart in His Body
The Sea-Maiden
The Tale of the Hoodie
The Young King Of Easaidh Ruadh
What Came of Picking Flowers

References

External links
The Three Daughters of King O'Hara

Irish fairy tales
Irish folklore
Fictional princesses
Female characters in fairy tales
Fiction about shapeshifting
ATU 400-459
ATU 300-399
Jeremiah Curtin